Coenraad Lodewijk Dirk "Coen" van Vrijberghe de Coningh (November 12, 1950 – November 15, 1997) was a Dutch actor, musician, composer, record producer and television presenter.

Biography
Born in Amsterdam to actor Cruys Voorbergh and the younger brother of artist Emmy van Vrijberghe de Coningh, he enrolled at the Academy of Theatre and Dance at the age of 17. He also played the guitar in high school. After graduation, De Coningh made his stage debut as a background singer and dancer in plays written by Annie M. G. Schmidt and Harry Bannink and he appeared in a cabaret sketch by Rients Gratama in the mid-1970s. He also served as the host of the NCRV show Showroom from 1977 until 1980.

On screen, De Coningh appeared in the 1989 film Lily Was Here. Before the film, he originally shortened his name to "Van Vrijberghe" as he felt his name was too long for movie posters. He was however, best known to Dutch audiences for his role as Johnnie Flodder in  the television series Flodder from 1993.

In 1987, he formed a cabaret band with Theo Nijland and Han Oldigs called The Shooting Party. In 1996, De Coningh provided the voice of Buzz Lightyear in the Dutch-Language version of the 1995 animated film Toy Story.

Personal life
From 1984 until his death in 1997, De Coningh was in a relationship with actress Wivineke van Groningen.

Death
On November 15, 1997, while attending a private company party with Stefan de Walle and Tatjana Šimić three days after his 47th birthday, De Coningh suffered a fatal heart attack and died after attempts to resuscitate him failed. He was buried at Zorgvlied Cemetery.

Following De Coningh's death, Flodder was promptly cancelled once his posthumous appearances aired. The Shooting Party was also disbanded.

Filmography

Cinema
Lily Was Here (1989) – Ted
Wilde Harten (1989) – Visser/Afficheplakker
Alaska (1989) – Mario
Het nadeel van de twijfel (1990) – Simon
The Indecent Woman (1991) – Charles
Ik verlaat je nooit (1993) 
Flodder 3 (1993) – Johnnie Flodder
Marie Antoinette is Not Dead (1996) – Journalist
The Boy Who Stopped Talking (1996) – Politieagent

Television
Switch (1988) – Martin
Prettig geregeld (1988)
Familie Oudenrijn (1990) – Hank
Staten Generaal (1991) – Journalist Jos
Recht voor z'n raab (1992) – Architect Paul Esders
Watt?! (1992) – Presenter
Pleidooi (1993) – Harry Govers
In voor- en tegenspoed (1993) – Makelaar
Flodder (1993–1998) – Johnnie Flodder
Kats & Co (1994) – Paul Kats
Bruin Goud (1995) – Haddert Halma
12 steden, 13 ongelukken (1996) – Ruud Erkels
Zeeuws Meisje (1997) – Hypnotiseur Aga Oerie Kahn
De Nieuwsgier (1997) – Various
Knoop in je Zakdoek (1997) – Rob

Voice dubbing
The Rescuers Down Under (1991) – Jake
Toy Story (1996) – Buzz Lightyear
101 Dalmatians (1997) – Jasper
Anastasia (1998) – Grigori Rasputin (posthumous release)

References

External links

1950 births
1997 deaths
Male actors from Amsterdam
Musicians from Amsterdam
Dutch male television actors
Dutch male film actors
Dutch male voice actors
Dutch male stage actors
Dutch male musical theatre actors
20th-century Dutch male singers
Dutch composers
Dutch record producers
Dutch television presenters
Dutch cabaret performers
20th-century Dutch male actors
20th-century Dutch composers